Laiphognathus is a genus of combtooth blennies found in the western Pacific and Indian Oceans.

Species
There are currently two recognized species in this genus:
 Laiphognathus longispinis Murase, 2007 (Crown spotty blenny)
 Laiphognathus multimaculatus J. L. B. Smith, 1955 (Spotty blenny)

References

 
Blenniinae